Baseball is not a mandatory sport in the Summer Universiade. In 1993, the sport was held at the XVII Summer Universiade in Buffalo, USA, and it was staged two years later at the XVIII Summer Universiade in Fukuoka, Japan. Twenty years later, the sport made a comeback at the 2015 Summer Universiade in Gwangju, South Korea, and was played again at the 2017 Summer Universiade in Taipei, Taiwan.

Events

Tournament results

Medal table

See also
Baseball awards#World
World University Baseball Championship

External links
Official Website of the 18th Summer Universiade
Official Website of the 28th Summer Universiade

 
Univ
Univ
Sports at the Summer Universiade
Universaide